Alyxia stellata, known as maile in Hawaiian, is a species of flowering plant in the dogbane family, Apocynaceae, that is native to Hawaii. It grows as either a twining liana, scandent shrub, or small erect shrub, and is one of the few vines that are endemic to the islands. The binomial nomenclature means "chain resembling olive" in Latin. The leaves are usually ternate, sometimes opposite, and can show both types on the same stem. Flowers are quite inconspicuous and have a sweet and light fragrance of honey. The bark is most fragrant and exudes a slightly sticky, milky sap when punctured, characteristic of the family Apocynaceae.  The entire plant contains coumarin, a sweet-smelling compound that is also present in vanilla grass (Anthoxanthum odoratum), woodruff (Galium odoratum) and mullein (Verbascum spp.).  Fruit are oval and dark purple when ripe.  Maile is a morphologically variable plant and the Hawaiian names reflect this (see Ethnobotany section).

Distribution and habitat
Lowland wet forests occur from  elevation in the Hawaiian Islands and are prime habitat for maile, receiving  of rainfall annually. Maile is also found in montane mesic and wet communities.

Ethnobotanical uses

Lei 
Maile is traditionally and still most popularly used in lei.  The vines are prepared and twined together to make an open lei or if people prefer they can close it.  In more rural areas it is typical for someone to pick their own maile if accessible, however because lei maile is so desirable, many floral shops carry these kinds of lei.  It is one of the only endemic Hawaiian plants grown commercially for lei.  Commercial maile plantations have become more common as some people feel that imported (non-Hawaiian) maile  is not as fragrant as Hawaiian maile.

Lāau Lapaau  
This plant was used medicinally to treat puho, puka puhi, kaupo, and  na eha moku kukonukonu e ae (other cuts).  Maile kaluhea was mashed with aukoi (Senna occidentalis) stalks, ahakea (Bobea spp.) and koa (Acacia koa) bark.  After water is added to this mixture and heated, it is put on infected areas to clean.

Local tradition 
Lei maile are often worn by the groom, and also by the groom's men in weddings which is a lovely sight.  For high school proms in Hawaii, the boy is often given a lei maile.  Birthdays, graduations, anniversaries and any celebration for that matter are all an occasion for lei maile, however many responsible stewards to the land understand there is not enough maile to go around for everyone.  This ties back in to local maile plantations that have started up.

Kapa 
Kapa, pounded wauke (Broussonetia papyrifera) is traditionally scented using fragrant plants such as maile, mokihana (Melicope anisata), lauae (Phymatosorus scolopendria), iliahi (Santalum spp.) and kamani (Calophyllum inophyllum).

Conservation 
Because maile is desirable for harvesting it is often incorporated into restoration plantings which can help bring the community into the conservation process.  One study looked at the potential of planting native Hawaiian plants as an understory layer to reduce weedy seedlings from sprouting up and gaining hold again in a restored area.  Maile, māmaki (Pipturus albidus) and palapalai (Microlepia strigosa) were the plants used.

Folklore 
Mention of the maile plant occurs in various stories (moolelo),  proverbs (ōlelo noeau), and in the song (mele) "Lei Awapuhi".

Lāieikawai
The maile sisters are a favorite stock characters in Hawaiian romance tales. The story of Lāieikawai  tells of five Maile sisters. Maile hai wale (brittle maile), Maile lau lii (small-leaved maile), Maile lau nui (large-leaved maile), Maile kaluhea (sweet-scented maile), and Maile pakaha (blunt-leaved maile).
Kauai's maile lau lii is often celebrated in song and chant.  The ōlelo noeau, Ka maile lau lii o Koiahi speaks of the "fine-leaved" maile of Kokee, Kauai which had one of the best and most fragrant maile lau lii in Hawaii and was praised in old chants. Because maile was often placed on heiau in traditional times, the older generations of Hawaiians say that the fragrance of maile still lingers in those areas where heiau once stood or are still standing.

Puna and Panaewa
Several ōlelo noeau from the Hilo and Puna districts on Hawaii Island paint a wonderfully fragrant picture of Puna and Panaewa. These were both places that had a moist climate suitable for maile and other fragrant ferns, as well as the famous hala (Pandanus tectorius) from Puna. The phrase Puna paia ala, fragrant walls of Puna, gives reference to the hīnano blossom which was famously hung inside hale of that district to scent the house. People traveled to both Puna and Panaewa in order to pick maile, hence those areas being remembered as fragrant.

Mōlī
Mary Kawena Pukui tells a story from Kaū on Hawaii Island of a beautiful young woman, Mōlī, whose father will let none other than a fisherman marry her (a good fisherman is well liked and prosperous because of the food he catches; it is also a sign of a much desired hard-working man).  A certain worthless fisherman who tricked Mōlī's father by rubbing fish guts (which were thrown out by others) on himself took her hand in marriage and did no work afterwards.  Driven to desperation, Mōlī decorated herself with a beautiful lei of ginger (Zingiber zerumbet), fern and maile and threw herself over the cliffs at Waiahukini.  It is said each year around the time of her death, Mōlī returns and when the wind blows, moaning and wailing can be heard.  The maile fragrance of her lei can also be smelled and if anyone goes there wearing a maile lei, they will be knocked to the ground.

Keaoua Kekuaokalani 
Keaoua Kekuaokalani, a cousin to Liholiho (Kamehameha II), objected to the overturn of the kapu system and with supporters, they gathered together with weapons at the battle of Kuamoo in attempt to restore the kapu taken away.  Hawaiians from the area where the battle took place hold that the fragrance of maile worn by the Kekuaokalani's warriors into battle can still be smelled.

References 

Bibliography

External links 

stellata
Endemic flora of Hawaii